Missile DATCOM is a widely used semi-empirical datasheet component build-up method for the preliminary design and analysis of missile aerodynamics and performance.  It has been in continual development for over twenty years, with the latest version released in December 2014.  It has traditionally been supplied free of charge by the United States Air Force to American defense contractors.  The code is considered restricted under International Traffic in Arms Regulations (ITAR) and should not be distributed outside the United States.

See also
Digital Datcom
Aeroprediction

References

Aerodynamics